The secondary labor market is the labor market consisting of high-turnover, low-pay, and usually part-time or temporary work. Sometimes, secondary jobs are performed by high school or college students. The majority of service sector, light manufacturing, and retail jobs are considered secondary labor.

Secondary market jobs are sometimes referred to as “food and filth” jobs, a reference to workers in fast food, retail, or yard work, for example.

A secondary-market job is distinct from a "secondary worker". The latter term refers to someone in a family (traditionally, the wife or a child) who earns a smaller income than the "breadwinner" in order to supplement family income.

See also
 Ethnic enclave
 Labor market segmentation
 Primary labor market
 Temporary work
 Underemployment

References

Employment classifications
Demographic economics